Hauck is a German patronymic family name, derived from the Germanic given name and surname Hugo, meaning "Bright in Mind and Spirit" or "intelligence". It may refer to the following notable persons:

Albert Hauck (1845–1918), German theologian and church historian
Alexander Hauck (born 1988), German international rugby union player
Bobby Hauck (born 1964), American college football coach
Emma Hauck (1878–1920), German outsider artist
Frederick Hauck (born 1941), retired captain in the United States Navy, a former fighter pilot and NASA astronaut
Guenther Hauck (born 1941), known as "Tatunca Nara", a German-Brazilian jungle guide and self-styled Indian chieftain
John Hauck (1829–1896), German-born American brewer, bank president, and baseball executive
Minnie Hauk (1851–1929), American operatic soprano
Rainer Hauck (born 1978), German association football (soccer) player
Rebecca Hauck (born 1969), American conwoman, accomplice to Matthew Cox
Tim Hauck (born 1966), American former gridiron football player

In Russian variation, Gauk:
Alexander Gauk (1893–1963), Russian conductor and composer

Other uses
Hauck House Museum, a historic house museum in Cincinnati, Ohio
Hauck, a German brand of baby equipment
The Hauck Brewery, a historic brewery in Harrison, New Jersey, from 1881 to 1920

References

German-language surnames
Surnames from given names